Dale Allen McCourt (born January 26, 1957) is a Canadian former professional ice hockey forward. He played in the National Hockey League with the Detroit Red Wings, Buffalo Sabres, and Toronto Maple Leafs between 1977 and 1984. He later played with HC Ambrì–Piotta in the Swiss Nationalliga A between 1985 and 1992. He was selected first overall by the Red Wings in the 1977 NHL amateur draft. Internationally McCourt played for the Canadian national team at the 1979 and 1981 World Championships.

Junior hockey
McCourt played major junior in the Ontario Hockey Association (OHA, renamed OMJHL during his tenure, today's OHL). As a 15-year-old, he was already playing Tier II junior hockey when called up by the Sudbury Wolves for part of the 1972–73 OHA season. He joined the Hamilton Red Wings for the full 1973–74 OHA season, and was team captain by the time the (renamed) Hamilton Fincups won the 1975–76 OMJHL Championship and then the national 1976 Memorial Cup championship.

In 1976–77, McCourt led the relocated St. Catharines Fincups as the team won the OMJHL Regular Season Championship. That season, McCourt was awarded the Red Tilson Trophy as the league's Most Outstanding Player and was voted the nationwide CHL Player of the Year.  Dale was also awarded the William Hanley Trophy as the OMJHL's Most Sportsmanlike Player in both 1975–76 and 1976–77.

In the 1977 World Junior Ice Hockey Championships, McCourt scored 18 points, a Canadian record he shares with Brayden Schenn and one point more than Eric Lindros and Wayne Gretzky.

McCourt was drafted 1st overall by the Detroit Red Wings in the 1977 NHL amateur draft. He made an impression on the Detroit Red Wings after being the first NHL amateur pick in 1977. He successfully scored 33 goals in the first year with the team. He was entitled to NHL rookie of the year with the Red Wings.

Professional career
McCourt led the Red Wings in scoring during his 1977–78 rookie season, finishing second only to Calder Memorial Trophy winner Mike Bossy for rookie scoring in the NHL that year.

Legal battle
Before the start of the 1978–79 season, Red Wings general manager Ted Lindsay signed Rogatien Vachon of the Los Angeles Kings, who was a restricted free agent at that time.  An NHL arbitrator ruled that McCourt should be the compensation paid the Kings for Vachon's loss, but McCourt refused to report to the Kings. Ultimately, this led to McCourt suing the NHL, National Hockey League Players' Association (NHLPA), the Red Wings, and Kings in order to prohibit being sent to the Los Angeles Kings as a part of any compensation package.  During this lawsuit, McCourt remained playing for the Red Wings, finishing the season second in Red Wing scoring (behind by only two points) for 1978-79. The matter was resolved, and McCourt remained in Detroit, but he felt betrayed by the fact that his own NHLPA, led by executive director Alan Eagleson, did not back him against the owners during the lawsuit. His legal case created a huge impact on sport and was the first sports case to challenge the antitrust laws during the bargaining agreement.

Trade
McCourt continued to be the Red Wings' top scorer in both his third (1979–80) and fourth (1980–81) seasons.  Despite this, and while leading the team in scoring a third of the way through the 1981–82 season, management did not feel he had achieved their overall expectations, trading McCourt to the Buffalo Sabres in December 1981—having produced at a point-a-game pace during his time with the Red Wings but failing to make the playoffs for three of his four years with the team.  He played with Buffalo before being claimed on waivers by the Toronto Maple Leafs in October 1983, finishing his NHL career at the end of the 1983–84 NHL season, with 478 points in 532 games played.

McCourt then played for 8 seasons for HC Ambrì-Piotta, in the top Swiss league. Ambrì-Piotta retired McCourt's number 15 jersey.

Hockey family
McCourt's brother Dan was an NHL linesman during the 1980s and early 1990s.

McCourt's uncle is Hockey Hall of Fame member George Armstrong.  Armstrong won the Red Tilson Trophy as the OHA's Most Outstanding Player in both 1947–48 and 
1949–50, the same award that McCourt received in 1976–77.  Armstrong was the coach of the Toronto Marlboros when they won the national Memorial Cup Championship in 1973 and 1975, the same championship that McCourt won as a player with the Hamilton Fincups in 1976.

Career statistics

Regular season and playoffs

International

Awards and honours
Directorate Award, Best Forward, 1977 World Junior Ice Hockey Championships

References

External links
 

1957 births
Living people
Buffalo Sabres players
Canadian ice hockey centres
Detroit Red Wings captains
Detroit Red Wings draft picks
Detroit Red Wings players
First Nations sportspeople
Hamilton Fincups players
Hamilton Red Wings (OHA) players
HC Ambrì-Piotta players
Ice hockey people from Ontario
Indianapolis Racers draft picks
National Hockey League first-overall draft picks
National Hockey League first-round draft picks
Sportspeople from Greater Sudbury
Sudbury Wolves players
Toronto Maple Leafs players